Eunice is an unincorporated community in southeastern Texas County, Missouri, United States. It is located approximately ten miles southeast of Houston on Route 17 midway between the communities of  Yukon and Midvale.

A post office called Eunice has been in operation since 1890. An early postmaster gave the community the name of his wife, Eunice Cooper.

References

Unincorporated communities in Texas County, Missouri
Unincorporated communities in Missouri